Marcus Latimer Hurley (December 22, 1883 – March 28, 1941) was an American cyclist who competed in the early twentieth century. He specialized in sprint cycling and won 4 gold medals in Cycling at the 1904 Summer Olympics and a bronze medal in the 2 mile race.

Biography
He was born on December 22, 1883. He was on the first national collegiate basketball championship team in 1908, serving as Columbia University's basketball team's captain.  Hurley served in World War I and was decorated. He died on March 28, 1941.

See also
List of multiple Olympic gold medalists at a single Games

References

1883 births
1941 deaths
All-American college men's basketball players
American male cyclists
American men's basketball players
Columbia Lions men's basketball players
Cyclists at the 1904 Summer Olympics
Medalists at the 1904 Summer Olympics
Olympic bronze medalists for the United States in cycling
Olympic gold medalists for the United States in cycling